Dubuc or du Buc may refer to:

Places
 Dubuc (electoral district), a provincial electoral district in Quebec, Canada
 Dubuc, Saskatchewan

People
 Aimée du Buc de Rivéry (1768–?), French heiress
 Alain Dubuc, Canadian journalist
 Alfred Dubuc (1871–1947), member of the Canadian House of Commons
 Jean Dubuc (1888–1958), Major League Baseball pitcher
 Jean Dubuc (politician) (born 1941), Canadian politician
 Jessika Dubuc (born 1983), Canadian synchronized swimmer
 Joseph Dubuc (1840–1914), Canadian lawyer and politician
 Lucien Dubuc (1877–1956), Canadian lawyer, judge and politician
 Luis Dubuc (born 1985), musician from Texas
 Marianne Dubuc (illustrator) (born 1980), Canadian writer and illustrator
 Marianne Dubuc (figure skater) (born 1983), Canadian figure skater
 Maryse Dubuc (born 1977), Canadian comics writer
 Nancy Dubuc, American businesswoman
 Nicole Dubuc (born 1978), American writer
 Pierre Dubuc (born 1947), Canadian editor, founder of L'aut'journal
 , French tennis player
  (1759–1827), French colonial administrator